Pureba may refer to:
Pureba, South Australia, a locality in western South Australia
Pureba Conservation Park, a conservation park in the locality, one of the Yellabinna Reserves
Hundred of Pureba, a cadastral area overlapping the above